A Briefer History of Time is a science humor book by the American astronomer Eric Schulman. In this book, Schulman presents humorous summaries of what he claims are the fifty-three most important events since the beginning of time.
The title and cover are a parody of Stephen Hawking's book A Brief History of Time. Coincidentally, Hawking would later write a "sequel" entitled A Briefer History of Time. Hawking's publisher Bantam Books was aware the title had already been used in a popular science book, but went ahead since "The other book was published six years ago, and Professor Hawking is an international figure."

In 2004 the author released the book under a creative commons license, CC BY-NC-ND 1.0, as free download on his website.

Description 
Laughing while learning is the intent of Schulman's book. The book shows why, even though the Universe is expanding, it doesn't get any easier to find a parking space. Furthermore, there is the pulp version of the origin of life ("It was a dark and stormy night. In the shallow tide pool, a nucleic acid base collided with a sugar molecule.  An amino acid sank beneath the murky depths . . . .").

References

1999 non-fiction books
Comedy books
Science books
English-language books
Creative Commons-licensed books